Hakim Belabbes (born 1961) is a Moroccan filmmaker.

Early life 
He was born in Bouja'd. His father owned the only movie theatre in the city. He studied American and African literature at Muhammad V University in Rabat, earning his bachelor's degree in 1983.

Filmography 
 Collapsed Walls, 2022
 Sweat Rain , 2017
 Weight of the Shadow  (Documentary), 2015
 Defining Love: A Failed Attempt , 2012
 Boiling Dreams , 2011
 Ashlaa (Documentary), 2009
 These Hands (Documentary), 2008
 Why O'Sea, 2006
 Khahit errouh , 2003
 Tell the Water (Documentary short), 2002
 A Witness (Short), 2001
 R'maa (Documentary short), 2001
 Three Angels, No Wings (Short), 2001
 Whispers (Documentary short), 1999
 A Shepherd and a Rifle, 1998
 Still Ready (Short), 1997
 Boujad: A Nest in the Heat (Documentary), 1992

References 

1961 births
Moroccan directors
Living people